Pleasant Vale Township is located in Pike County, Illinois. As of the 2010 census, its population was 573 and it contained 286 housing units. The town of New Canton is in this township.

Geography

Demographics

References

External links
City-data.com
Illinois State Archives

Townships in Pike County, Illinois
Townships in Illinois